Streptomyces griseoviridis is a filamentous bacterium species from the genus Streptomyces, which was isolated from soil in Texas, United States. Streptomyces griseoviridis produces etamycin, griseoviridin, bactobolin, prodigiosin R1, actinobolin, and rosophilin. Streptomyces griseoviridis can be used to protect plants since it inhibits the growth of fungal pathogens.

See also 
 List of Streptomyces species

References

Further reading

External links
Type strain of Streptomyces griseoviridis at BacDive – the Bacterial Diversity Metadatabase

griseoviridis
Bacteria described in 1956